Apoorva is a 2016 Kannada film written, produced and directed by Ravichandran who also composed the music. The movie stars  V Ravichandran and Mysore-based actress Apoorva. The film will see Vijay Raghavendra  and his wife playing the role of Ravichandaran's son and daughter-in-law. Actor Sudeepa has also done a special role in the movie. . The crux of the film is a love story which takes place between a 61-year-old man and 19-year-old girl. The film was declared a "flop" at the box office.

Plot
Rajshekhar (Ravichandran) is a 61 year old painter and married by circumstances to his manager's daughter. They have a son but marriage is not that normal type.  Rajshekhar for past 40 years goes in to a mall and do painting. One bad day when he goes in his bag is used as vehicle of getting weapons in to mall by terrorist (Sudeepa) gang for kind of terrorist activities. The picturisation of this act is so new that the viewer only listen to it from inside elevator where the Rajshekhar and Apoorva (Apoorva) are stuck. By end of the mall elevator episode the Apoorva falls in love with the Rajshekhar.  He will also announce his love story to the family. He will come to meet the Apoorva who is a TV anchor where he learns that she has a boyfriend and she refuse to accept Rajshekhar as his lover.

Cast  
 V. Ravichandran as Rajashekar
 Apoorva as Apoorva
 Sudeepa in a cameo appearance
 Vijay Raghavendra in a guest appearance
 Spandana Vijay Raghavendra in a guest appearance
 Pavithra Lokesh in a guest appearance
 P. Ravi Shankar in a cameo appearance
 Prakash Raj (voice over)
 Tara (voice over)
 Sadhu Kokila (voice over)
 Rangayana Raghu (voice over)

Production
Most of the film is shot in a lift at Ravichandran's residence who altered it just to shoot for the film. Ravichandran expects this movie to be better than Premaloka. The movie contains quotes about love such as "Death, a reason to love. Love, a reason to die", "The world does not matter to the person who has fallen in love", etc.

Soundtrack

The audio rights of the film was bought by Lahari Music for 72 lakh, a record deal in Kannada film industry. The deal was finalised on 1 January 2015.

The audio of the film was released on Valentine's Day. The audio launch was exclusively telecast on Udaya TV  and featured top stars of Kannada industry. Prior to the launch, Ravichandran revealed, "Each song from Apoorva will be launched by celebrities including Shivarajkumar, Ramesh Aravind, Upendra, Darshan, Puneeth Rajkumar, Ganesh and Yash. Sudeep has already worked in the film and will host the launch with me," and added, "I want everybody to enjoy Valentine’s Day with us and make it a special day of love. Everyone should get ready for this special musical treat and Valentine date with Apoorva."

References

External links
 

2016 films
2016 romance films
Films directed by V. Ravichandran
Indian romance films
Films set in elevators
2010s Kannada-language films